Guinevere is King Arthur's queen in the Arthurian legend.

Guinevere may also refer to:

Arts and entertainment
 Guinevere (1999 film), an American drama film 
 Guinevere (1994 film), a television movie about the legendary queen
 Guenevere, Queen of the Summer Country, a novel by Rosalind Miles
 Guinevere, a 2001 play by Gina Gionfriddo
 "Guinevere" (song), a 1966 song performed by Donovan
 "Guinevere", a 2010 song by the Eli Young Band from Jet Black & Jealous
 Guinevere Jones, the title character of a Canadian/Australian fantasy television series and a series of four novels
 Guinivere, the princess of Bern from Fire Emblem: The Binding Blade
 Guinevere, a van from the 2020 film Onward
 Guinevere trilogy, a novel sequence by Persia Woolley

People
 Guinevere Kauffmann (born 1968), American astrophysicist
 Guinevere Turner (born 1968), American actress, screenwriter, and film director
 Guinevere Van Seenus (born 1977), American model, photographer and jewelry designer

Other uses
 , a patrol vessel commissioned in 1917 and wrecked in 1918
 , a patrol vessel in commission from 1942 to 1945
 2483 Guinevere, an asteroid

See also 
 Guinevere Castle, a peak in the Grand Canyon
 Guinevere Planitia, a lowland region of the planet Venus
 Guenhwyvar, a panther from Dungeons & Dragons
 "Guinnevere", a song written by David Crosby on the 1969 album Crosby, Stills & Nash
 Gwenevere, the title character in Princess Gwenevere and the Jewel Riders
 Jennifer (given name), a Cornish variation of the name
 Gwenhwyfar (12th century), a daughter of Dafydd ab Owain Gwynedd and Emma of Anjou
 Gwynevere, Princess of Sunlight, a non-player character in the video game Dark Souls

Feminine given names